Hilltop Lakes is a census-designated place and unincorporated community in Leon County, Texas, United States. As of the 2010 census, the population was 1,101.

Geography
The community is built around several artificial lakes, including Mirror Lake, Swan Lake, Kickapoo Lake, Cherokee Lake, and Lake Tonkawa. The lakes are built on Running Creek or a tributary, with Running Creek flowing south to the Navasota River.

In popular culture 

The character Leonard von Lutz from "Alaina Gleen: Imaginary Vacation" (also known as "Alaina Gleen 3") has a mansion with a "Texas shaped and sized pool he never leaves" in this community.

References

External links
 Hilltop Lakes Property Owners Association
 

Census-designated places in Leon County, Texas
Unincorporated communities in Texas
Census-designated places in Texas
Unincorporated communities in Leon County, Texas